Love & Understanding is the seventh studio album by the funk band Kool & the Gang, released in 1976. The album had mild success. Three tracks, "Hollywood Swinging", "Summer Madness" and "Universal Sound" were recorded live at the Rainbow Theatre in London, England.

Record World said of the title track that "Kool's combination of chanting vocals, horns and electronics forms a patented style all his own."

Track listing

Personnel
 Bass, vocals – Robert "Kool" Bell
 Drums, percussion, vocals – George Brown
 Guitar – Claydes Smith, Kevin Bell
 Piano – Ricky West
 Alto saxophone – Peter Duarte
 Alto saxophone, vocals, flute, congas – Dennis Thomas
 Tenor saxophone – Dennis White
 Tenor saxophone, alto flute, piano, vocals, ARP synthesizer – Ronald Bell
 Trombone – Ray Wright
 Trombone, vocals – Otha Nash
 Trumpet – Spike Mickens
 Trumpet, flugelhorn, vocals – Larry Gitten
 Backing vocals – Don Boyce, Royal Jackson, Something Sweet, Tomorrow's Edition

Production
 Produced, Arranged and Written by Kool & the Gang
 Executive Producer – Khalis Bayyan
 Engineers – B. Clearwater, Harvey Goldberg and Terry Rosiello.
 Mixed by Terry Rosiellio
 Mastered by Earl Williams
 Design – Frank Daniel 
 Photography – Simon De Cherpitel and Bill Peronneau

Charts

Weekly charts

Year-end charts

References

Kool & the Gang albums
1976 albums
De-Lite Records albums